The Ghosayatra Parva is a section and an episode of the Hindu epic Mahabharata. Consisting of 519 shlokas, it is named after the episode in which the Kauravas undertake an expedition to see the cowherds of Dvaitavana, a forest where the Pandavas reside. This is done under the pretext of cattle inspection, but with the ulterior motive of humiliating their cousins. During the course of this episode, the Kauravas are captured by the gandharvas, and are released from their captivity by the Pandavas. Duryodhana finds the outcome of the entire affair embarrassing, and resolves to fast to death until he is dissuaded from this course of action. Instead, he opts to return to Hastinapura to perform a sacrifice.

Synopsis 
After Pandavas lost in dice game and went on for exile, Duryodhana planned to humiliate Pandavas by showing them the luxuries enjoyed by all Kauravas and Karna. So all of them had set to forest where Pandavas were living. In the course of Journey, Duryodhana abducted a lady without knowing that she was a Gandharva. Then Gandharvas attacked entire Kauravas and Karna. Kauravas and Karna got defeated. Karna tried run away from battle-field after getting defeated by Chitrasena but he couldn't since Gandharvas captured all Kauravas and Karna. On knowing this, Yudhishtira asked Arjuna to free them since its Hastinapur which would be insulted. Arjuna followed his eldest brother's order and first requested Chitrasena to release Kauravas and Karna. Chitrasena rejected and asked Arjuna to fight with him in order to free Kauravas and Karna. Thus a battle took place. Arjuna defeated many warriors. Chitrasena became invisible and started fighting with Arjuna.
Arjuna used Shabdavedi astra and captured Chitrasena. During the fight with Chitrasena, Arjuna had performed extremely impossible feats as he killed 10 lakh Gandharvas (4.5 akshouni) in single shot by using Agneyastra. Apart from Arjuna, no warrior ever achieved this impossible feats even in dreams. Finally Arjuna made Kauravas and Karna free. Chitrasena got impressed with Arjuna's skills and granted him Sammohanastra.

References

External links 
 Ghosayatra Parva

Mahabharata
Hindu mythology
Parvas in Mahabharata